Neela or Neelah  is a village of Chakwal Tehsil in Pakistan. It is located in Chakwal District, Punjab. It lies about 4 kilometers from the M2 motorway and about 45 kilometers from the district capital, Chakwal.

References 

Villages in Chakwal District